Lanie Alabanza-Barcena (born September 26, 1979), also known as Miss Lawn, is an American graphic designer, fashion designer, and the co-founder and creative director of the female streetwear brand HLZBLZ.

Early career
Alabanza-Barcena worked for the street clothing line Triple 5 Soul between 2003 and 2004. In 2004, she left to take on the position of art director for the hip-hop artist Jay-Z’s label Rocawear Juniors. While there, she designed collections within the label for Patricia Field and Rihanna.

Alabanza-Barcena decided to launch her own label with her husband Bam Barcena: HELLZ BELLZ (aka HLZBLZ) in 2005. The label focused on women's streetwear,launching its first collection in the fall of 2006.  It reached number 20 in Complex Media's best 50 streetwear brands of all time.

Other projects
Alabanza-Barcen has collaborated with Stüssy, Vans, G-Shock, Reebok, Sanrio, Mosley Tribes and Warner Bros.

Lawn has also launched other projects, including Belle of the Brawl, a women's contemporary brand LABISM, a concept store located in Manila, and JUNYA MAFIA, a unisex label alongside her husband and brother-in-law.

References

American fashion designers
1979 births
Living people
American women fashion designers
21st-century American women
American designers